The Cabinet Strauss II (German: Kabinett Strauß II) was the state government of the German state of Bavaria from 27 October 1982 to 30 October 1986. The Cabinet was headed by Minister President Franz Josef Strauss and was formed by the Christian Social Union. It was replaced by the Cabinet Strauss III.

Composition 

|}

References

Strauss I
1982 establishments in Germany
1986 disestablishments in Germany